Penychain railway station, formerly known as (and still sometimes referred to as) Butlins Penychain railway station, is located by an over bridge at Pen-ychain on the Llŷn Peninsula in Gwynedd, Wales. This railway station is an unstaffed halt on the Cambrian Coast Railway with passenger services to Pwllheli, Porthmadog, Harlech, Barmouth, Machynlleth and Shrewsbury. For many years the station served the large Butlins Holiday Camp at Penychain.

History
The station opened on 31 July 1933 as a halt. Butlin's built the adjacent camp in 1940 at the request of the Admiralty to serve as HMS Glendower, a Royal Navy training base. After the end of the war the camp opened in March 1947 as Butlin's Pwllheli holiday camp and the halt was upgraded to a station on 3 April 1947. The station was particularly busy in the 1950s and early 1960s when most holidaymakers arrived at the camp either by train or coach. Following the closure of the railway line from Caernarfon to Afonwen Junction (about two miles east of Penychain) and the growing popularity of the motor car, fewer campers arrived by train from the mid-1960s onwards. The station was almost universally referred to as 'penny-chain' by non-Welsh speaking holidaymakers. Meanwhile, Butlins had their own road-going 'Puffing Billy' train to ferry Campers to/from the main railway station on Saturdays. This was also used for trips around the camp on other days.

The holiday camp was divided into two halves by the railway. A single-span over-bridge connected the South Camp to the West, Middle, and East Camp areas which were located to the north of the railway line. Penychain station also had its own signal box located just beyond the end of the platform - in the picture shown here.

Although much reduced in size, and now with only a single platform, it is still open and now serves the Haven Holiday Park and caravan park on the former Butlins site. The station was destaffed in 1960s and trains only call by request.

Facilities
An electronic departure board, with announcements of incoming trains, was installed in 2012.

Services
A limited service (3 each way in summer, just one in winter) operates on Sundays.

References

Sources

External links 

 By DMU from Pwllheli to Amlwch, via Huntley Archives

Railway stations in Gwynedd
DfT Category F2 stations
Former Great Western Railway stations
Railway stations in Great Britain opened in 1933
Railway stations served by Transport for Wales Rail
Railway request stops in Great Britain
Butlins
Llanystumdwy
1933 establishments in Wales